Public broadcasting involves radio, television and other electronic media outlets whose primary mission is public service. Public broadcasters receive funding from diverse sources including license fees, individual contributions, public financing and commercial financing.

Public broadcasting may be nationally or locally operated, depending on the country and the station. In some countries a single organization runs public broadcasting. Other countries have multiple public-broadcasting organizations operating regionally or in different languages. Historically, public broadcasting was once the dominant or only form of broadcasting in many countries (with the notable exceptions of the United States, Mexico and Brazil). Commercial broadcasting now also exists in most of these countries; the number of countries with only public broadcasting declined substantially during the latter part of the 20th century.

Definition
The primary mission of public broadcasting is that of public service, speaking to and engaging as a citizen. The British model has been widely accepted as a universal definition. The model embodies the following principles:

 Universal geographic accessibility
 Universal appeal
 Attention to minorities
 Contribution to national identity and sense of community
 Distance from vested interests
 Direct funding and universality of payment
 Competition in good programming rather than numbers
 Guidelines that liberate rather than restrict

While application of certain principles may be straightforward, as in the case of accessibility, some of the principles may be poorly defined or difficult to implement. In the context of a shifting national identity, the role of public broadcasting may be unclear. Likewise, the subjective nature of good programming may raise the question of individual or public taste.

Within public broadcasting there are two different views regarding commercial activity. One is that public broadcasting is incompatible with commercial objectives. The other is that public broadcasting can and should compete in the marketplace with commercial broadcasters. This dichotomy is highlighted by the public service aspects of traditional commercial broadcasters.

Public broadcasters in each jurisdiction may or may not be synonymous with government controlled broadcasters. In some countries, public broadcasters are not sanctioned by government departments and have independent means of funding, and thus enjoy editorial independence.

Technology
Public broadcasting utilizes AM and FM radio, television, and internet technologies.

Economics
Public broadcasters may receive their funding from an obligatory television licence fee, individual contributions, government funding or commercial sources. Public broadcasters do not rely on advertising to the same degree as commercial broadcasters, or at all; this allows public broadcasters to transmit programmes that are not commercially viable to the mass market, such as public affairs shows, radio and television documentaries, and educational programmes.

One of the principles of public broadcasting is to provide coverage of interests for which there are missing or small markets. Public broadcasting attempts to supply topics of social benefit that are otherwise not provided by commercial broadcasters. Typically, such underprovision is argued to exist when the benefits to viewers are relatively high in comparison to the benefits to advertisers from contacting viewers. This frequently is the case in undeveloped countries that normally have low benefits to advertising.

An alternative funding model proposed by Michael Slaby is to give every citizen credits they can use to pay qualified media sources for civic information and reporting.

Cultural policy
Additionally, public broadcasting may facilitate the implementation of a cultural policy (an industrial policy and investment policy for culture). Examples include:

In Australia, the Australian Broadcasting Corporation is legally required to 'encourage and promote the musical, dramatic and other performing arts in Australia' and 'broadcasting programmes that contribute to a sense of national identity' with specific emphasis on regional and rural Australia'. Furthermore, the Special Broadcasting Service (SBS) is intended to reflect the spirit and sense of multicultural richness and the unique international cultural values within Australian society.

Worldwide
Modern public broadcasting is often a mixed commercial model. For example, the CBC is funded by advertising revenue supplemented by a government subsidy to support its television service.

Americas

Argentina
State presence in television had a strong history, not in the way of European style public service radio or television.
The private sector has taken an active role in the development of television in Buenos Aires. In opposition, state broadcasters tend to be federal and technical innovative, such as the
Televisión Pública Argentina, the first national TV station, 68 years old.

Brazil

In Brazil, the two main national public broadcasters are Empresa Brasil de Comunicação (EBC) and the Fundação Padre Anchieta (FPA). EBC was created in 2007 to manage the Brazilian federal government's radio and television stations. EBC owns broadcast the television channel TV Brasil (launched in 2007, being the merger of TVE Brasil, launched in Rio de Janeiro in 1975, and TV Nacional, launched in Brasilia in 1960), the radio stations Rádio Nacional and Rádio MEC, broadcast to Brasilia, Rio de Janeiro, São Paulo, Belo Horizonte, Recife, and Tabatinga, Rádio Nacional da Amazônia, a shortwave radio station based in Brasília with programming aimed to the population of the Amazon region, and Agência Brasil, a news agency. Starting in 2021, EBC expanded the coverage of its radio stations through the new FM extended band to the metropolitan areas of São Paulo, Belo Horizonte and Recife, important Brazilian regions which did not have EBC radio stations.

FPA is a non-profit foundation created by the government of the state of São Paulo in 1967 and includes a national educational public television network (TV Cultura, launched in 1969 in São Paulo, which is available in all Brazilian states through its 135 affiliates), two radio stations (Rádio Cultura FM and Rádio Cultura Brasil, both broadcasting to Greater São Paulo), two educational TV channels aimed at distance education (TV Educação and Univesp TV, which is available on free-to-air digital TV in São Paulo and nationally by cable and satellite), and the children's TV channel TV Rá-Tim-Bum, available nationally on pay TV.

Many Brazilian states also have regional and statewide public radio and television stations. One example is Minas Gerais, which has the EMC (Empresa Mineira de Comunicação), a public corporation created in 2016 modelled on EBC, formed by Rede Minas, a statewide television network and the two stations of Rádio Inconfidência, which operates in AM, FM and shortwave; in the state of Pará, the state-funded foundation FUNTELPA (Fundação Paraense de Radiodifusão) operates the public educational state-wide television network Rede Cultura do Pará (which covers the entire state of Pará, reaching many cities of Brazilian Amazon) and Rádio Cultura, a public radio station which broadcasts in FM for Belém. The state of Espírito Santo has the RTV-ES (Rádio e Televisão Espírito Santo), with its television channel TVE-ES (TV Educativa do Espírito Santo) and an AM radio station (Rádio Espírito Santo), and in Rio Grande do Sul, the state-wide public television channel TVE-RS (TV Educativa do Rio Grande do Sul) and the public radio station FM Cultura (which broadcasts for Porto Alegre metropolitan area) are the two public broadcasters in the state. Regional public television channels in Brazil often broadcast part of TV Brasil or TV Cultura programming among with some hours of local programming.

Since the government of Michel Temer, EBC has received several criticism from some politicians for having an alleged political bias. The current president of Brazil, Jair Bolsonaro, said in his campaign for the presidential election in 2018 that the public broadcaster is allegedly a "job hanger" (public company existing only for the purpose of securing positions for political allies) and has proposed to privatize or extinguish the public company. On April 9, 2021, the president inserted the public company into the National Privatization Program, with the intention of carrying out studies about the possibility of privatization of the public broadcaster. Some states often had problems with their public broadcasting services. In São Paulo, FPA had sometimes dealt with budget cuts, labor disputes and strikes. In Rio Grande do Sul, TVE-RS and FM Cultura were managed by the Piratini Foundation, a non-profit state foundation. However, due to the public debt crisis in the state, in 2018, the Piratini Foundation had its activities closed, and TVE-RS and FM Cultura started to be managed by the Secretariat of Communication of the state government.

Brazil also has many campus radio and community radio stations and several educational local TV channels (many of them belonging to public and private universities).

Canada

In Canada, the main public broadcaster is the national Canadian Broadcasting Corporation (CBC), a crown corporation – which originated as a radio network in November 1936. It is the successor to the Canadian Radio Broadcasting Commission (CRBC), which was established by the administration of Prime Minister R.B. Bennett in 1932, modeled on recommendations made in 1929 by the Royal Commission on Radio Broadcasting and stemming from lobbying efforts by the Canadian Radio League. The Canadian Broadcasting Corporation took over operation of the CRBC's nine radio stations (which were largely concentrated in major cities across Canada, including Toronto, Vancouver, Montreal and Ottawa). The CBC eventually expanded to television in September 1952 with the sign-on of CBFT in Montreal; CBFT was the first television station in Canada to initiate full-time broadcasts, which initially served as a primary affiliate of the French language Télévision de Radio-Canada and a secondary affiliate of the English language CBC Television service.

CBC operates two national television networks (CBC Television and Ici Radio-Canada Télé), four radio networks (CBC Radio One, CBC Radio 2, Ici Radio-Canada Première and Ici Musique) and several cable television channels including two 24-hour news channels (CBC News Network and Ici RDI) in both of Canada's official languages – English and French – and the French-language channels Ici Explora and Ici ARTV, dedicated to science and culture respectively. CBC's national television operations and some radio operations are funded partly by advertisements, in addition to the subsidy provided by the federal government. The cable channels are commercial entities owned and operated by the CBC and do not receive any direct public funds, however, they do benefit from synergies with resources from the other CBC operations. The CBC has frequently dealt with budget cuts and labour disputes, often resulting in a debate about whether the service has the resources necessary to properly fulfill its mandate.

, all of CBC Television's terrestrial stations are owned and operated by the CBC directly. The number of privately owned CBC Television affiliates has gradually declined in recent years, as the network has moved its programming to stations opened by the corporation or has purchased certain affiliates from private broadcasting groups; budgetary issues led the CBC to choose not to launch new rebroadcast transmitters in markets where the network disaffiliated from a private station after 2006; the network dropped its remaining private affiliates in 2016, when CJDC-TV—Dawson Creek and CFTK-TV—Terrace, British Columbia defected from CBC Television that February and Lloydminster-based CKSA-DT disaffiliated in August of that year (to become affiliates of CTV Two and Global, respectively). The CBC's decision to disaffiliate from these and other privately owned stations, as well as the corporation decommissioning its network of rebroadcasters following Canada's transition to digital television in August 2011 have significantly reduced the terrestrial coverage of both CBC Television and Ici Radio-Canada Télé; the Canadian Radio-television and Telecommunications Commission (CRTC) does require cable, satellite and IPTV providers to carry CBC and Radio-Canada stations as part of their basic tier, regardless of terrestrial availability in an individual market. Of the three major French-language television networks in Canada, Ici Radio-Canada Télé is the only one that maintains terrestrial owned-and-operated stations and affiliates in all ten Canadian provinces, although it maintains only one station (Moncton, New Brunswick-based CBAFT-DT) that serves the four provinces comprising Atlantic Canada.

In recent years, the CBC has also expanded into new media ventures including the online radio service CBC Radio 3, music streaming service CBC Music, and the launch of online news services, such as CBC Hamilton, in some markets which are not directly served by their own CBC television or radio stations.

In addition, several provinces operate public broadcasters; these are not CBC subentities, but distinct networks in their own right. Most of the provincial services maintain an educational programming format, differing from the primarily entertainment-based CBC/Radio-Canada operations, but more closely formatted to (and carrying many of the same programs as) the U.S.-based Public Broadcasting Service (PBS), which itself is available terrestrially and – under a CRTC rule that requires Canadian cable, satellite and IPTV providers to carry affiliates of the four major U.S. commercial networks (ABC, NBC, CBS and Fox) and a PBS member station – through pay television providers in Canada via member stations located near the U.S.–Canada border. These educational public broadcasters include the English-language TVOntario (TVO) and the French-language TFO in Ontario, Télé-Québec in Quebec, and Knowledge Network in British Columbia. TVO and Télé-Québec operate through conventional transmitters and cable, while TFO and Knowledge Network are cable-only channels. Beyond these and other provincial services, Canada does not have a national public educational network.

Canada is also home to a number of former public broadcasting entities that have gone private. CTV Two Alberta, which is licensed as an educational television station in Alberta, was once owned by the Alberta government as the public broadcaster Access. In 1993, the provincial government agreed to cease to direct funding of Access after the 1994 fiscal year; the channel was sold to CHUM Limited in 1995, which initially acquired the channel through a majority-owned subsidiary, Learning and Skills Television of Alberta Limited (LSTA). To fulfill its license conditions as an educational station, it broadcasts educational and children's programming during the daytime hours, while airing entertainment programming favoured by advertisers and viewers in prime time. The service discontinued its broadcast transmitters in Calgary and Edmonton in August 2011, due to the expense of transitioning the two stations to digital, and the fact that the service had mandatory carriage on television providers serving Alberta regardless of whether it ran over-the-air transmitters. The service has since operated as part of Bell Media's CTV Two chain of stations.

Public radio station CKUA in Alberta was also formerly operated by Access, before being sold to the non-profit CKUA Radio Foundation which continues to operate it as a community-funded radio network. CJRT-FM in Toronto also operated as a public government-owned radio station for many years; while no longer funded by the provincial government, it still solicits most of its budget from listener and corporate donations and is permitted to air only a very small amount of commercial advertising.

City Saskatchewan originated as the Saskatchewan Communications Network, a cable-only educational and cultural public broadcaster owned by the government of Saskatchewan. SCN was sold to Bluepoint Investment Corporation in 2010, and like CTV Two Alberta did when it became privatized, incorporated a limited schedule of entertainment programming during the late afternoon and nighttime hours, while retaining educational and children's programs during the morning until mid-afternoon to fulfill its licensing conditions; Bluepoint later sold the channel to Rogers Media in 2012, expanding a relationship it began with SCN in January of that year, when Rogers began supplying entertainment programming to the channel through an affiliation agreement with its English-language broadcast network, Citytv. One television station, CFTU in Montreal, operates as an educational station owned by CANAL, a private not-for-profit consortium of educational institutions in the province of Quebec.

Some local community stations also operate non-commercially with funding from corporate and individual donors. In addition, cable companies are required to produce a local community channel in each licensed market. Such channels have traditionally aired community talk shows, city council meetings and other locally oriented programming, although it is becoming increasingly common for them to adopt the format and branding of a local news channel.

Canada also has a large number of campus radio and community radio stations.

Colombia

Colombia had between 1955 and 1998 a public television system very similar to that adopted by the NPO in the Netherlands, where private television producers called "programadoras" were given hours on the country's two public television channels (Cadena Uno and Canal A). In 1998, when the Colombian government allowed the opening of television to the private market by granting two broadcast licenses to the programadoras Caracol Televisión and RCN Televisión, these television producers went into crisis, causing many to end their activities or produce content for the private television channels. Currently, Colombia has three public channels (one is operated by a private company formed by the shares of four former programadoras) and eight public radio stations (three stations are regional broadcasters).

Chile

Chilean television was founded through universities, in an attempt to bring public television without the state having to pay directly and control content. The University of Chile (owner of the former channels 9 and 11 until 1993), the Catholic University of Chile on channels 2 and 13 until 2010, and the Pontifical Catholic University of Valparaíso on channels 8 and 4. Channel 8, in Valparaíso, is the first and oldest station on Chile, transmitting since 5 October 1957. As soon as 1961 universities began transmitting advertisements between their programmes, the first of them being the Channel 9, showing a Motorola TV set. This kind of disguised advertising took the name of "Payola". This situation, added to the fact that TV was only reaching Santiago and Valparaíso, led to the creation of a state network that should serve the entire country. This network, created in 1964 and in operation since 24 October 1969, is known as "Televisión Nacional de Chile". After the military government of Augusto Pinochet, television was mostly deregulated. Thus, two new commercial channels were born: Megavisión (Channel 9, on 23 October 1990) and La Red (Channel 4, on 12 May 1991). The University of Chile's Channel 11 also was rented to a private operator on 1 October 1993 and is now known today as "Chilevisión".

Televisión Nacional, popularly known as Channel 7 due to its Santiago frequency, is governed by a seven-member board appointed by both the President and the Senate. It is meant to be independent of political pressures, although accusations of bias have been made, especially during election campaigns.

Ecuador
Ecuador TV is the public service channel of Ecuador, established in October 2007. The channel was established at the same time as the installation of the Ecuadorian Constituent Assembly so that the sessions could be transmitted live to all the country.

El Salvador 
Salvadoran broadcasting has a public service radio and television channel. On 1 March 1926 began the operation as the first Central American broadcasting network called "Radio Nacional de El Salvador" with a frequency of 96.9 FM MHz founded by the president of that era, Alfonso Quiñónez Molina. On 4 November 1964 the Government of El Salvador founded Televisión Educativa de El Salvador as an educational television with the channels 8 and 10. And since 1989, Channel 10 became the only public television channel in El Salvador.

Mexico 
In Mexico, public stations are operated by municipalities, state governments and universities, there are five national public channels.
Canal Once is owned, and operated by the National Politechnical Institute. It started transmissions on 2 March 1959 as the first public broadcasting television in Mexico. The government of Mexico implemented Telesecundaria in 1968 to provide secondary education to students in rural areas through broadcast television channels, such as XHGC-TV in Mexico City. With the launching of the Morelos II satellite, Telesecundaria began transmitting on one of its analog channels in 1988; in 1994, it began broadcasting in digital format with the advent of the Solidaridad I satellite, and Edusat was established and began transmitting in Mexico, Central America and certain regions of the United States. In 1982, Canal 22 was founded and began operations eleven years later by the Ministry of Culture as part of the "RED México". In 2005 the National Autonomous University of Mexico (UNAM in Spanish) began transmissions as the sister channel of XEUN-AM and XEUN-FM (both radio stations founded in 1959), TV UNAM which is part of the university and cultural diffusion. Canal Catorce was founded in 2012 and is operated by the Sistema Público de Radiodifusión del Estado Mexicano (SPR), an agency from the Federal Government.

United States

In the United States, public broadcasters may receive some funding from both federal and state sources, but generally most of their financial support comes from underwriting by foundations and businesses (ranging from small shops to corporations), along with audience contributions via pledge drives. The great majority operate as private not-for-profit corporations.

History
Early public stations were operated by state colleges and universities, and were often run as part of the schools' cooperative extension services. Stations in this era were internally funded, and did not rely on listener contributions to operate; some accepted advertising. Networks such as Iowa Public Radio, South Dakota Public Radio, and Wisconsin Public Radio began under this structure. The concept of a "non-commercial, educational" station per se did not show up in U.S. law until 1941, when the FM band was authorized to begin normal broadcasting. Houston's KUHT was the nation's first public television station founded by Dr. John W. Meaney, and signed on the air on May 25, 1953, from the campus of the University of Houston. In rural areas, it was not uncommon for colleges to operate commercial stations instead (e.g., the University of Missouri's KOMU, an NBC-affiliated television station in Columbia). The FCC had reserved almost 250 broadcast frequencies for use as educational television stations in 1953, though by 1960, only 44 stations allocated for educational use had begun operations.

The passage of the Public Broadcasting Act of 1967 precipitated the development of the current public broadcasting system in the U.S. The legislation established the Corporation for Public Broadcasting (CPB), a private entity that is charged with facilitating programming diversity among public broadcasters, the development and expansion of non-commercial broadcasting, and providing funding to local stations to help them create programs; the CPB receives funding earmarked by the federal government as well as through public and private donations.

Public television and radio in the U.S. has, from the late 1960s onward, dealt with severe criticism from conservative politicians and think-tanks (such as The Heritage Foundation), which allege that its programming has a leftist bias and there have been successful attempts to reduce – though not eliminate – funding for public television stations by some state legislatures.

Radio
The first public radio network in the United States was founded in 1949 in Berkeley, California, as station KPFA, which became and remains the flagship station for a national network called Pacifica Radio. From the beginning, the network has refused corporate funding of any kind, and has relied mainly on listener support. KPFA gave away free FM radios to build a listener base and to encourage listeners to "subscribe" (support the station directly with donations). It is the world's oldest listener-supported radio network. Since the creation of the Corporation for Public Broadcasting, Pacifica has sometimes received CPB support. Pacifica runs other stations in Los Angeles, New York City, Washington, DC. and Houston, as well as repeater stations and a large network of affiliates.

A national public radio network, National Public Radio (NPR), was created in February 1970, following the passage of the Public Broadcasting Act of 1967. This network replaced the Ford Foundation-backed National Educational Radio Network. Some independent local public radio stations buy their programming from distributors such as NPR; Public Radio International (PRI); American Public Media (APM); Public Radio Exchange (PRX); and Pacifica Radio, most often distributed through the Public Radio Satellite System. Cultural Native American and Mexican American music and programming are also featured regionally. NPR is colloquially though inaccurately conflated with public radio as a whole, when in fact "public radio" includes many organizations.

Television
In the United States, the Public Broadcasting Service (PBS) serves as the nation's main public television provider. When it launched in October 1970, PBS assumed many of the functions of its predecessor, National Educational Television (NET). NET was shut down by the Ford Foundation and the Corporation for Public Broadcasting after the network refused to stop airing documentaries on varying social issues that had alienated many of the network's affiliates. PBS would later acquire Educational Television Stations, an organization founded by the National Association of Educational Broadcasters (NAEB), in 1973.

Uruguay
Uruguay has a strong history of public broadcasting in South America. Inaugurated in 1963, Televisión Nacional Uruguay (TNU) is now linked to the Ministry of Education and Culture of the country. In addition, the Radiodifusión Nacional de Uruguay is a network of radios with 4 different stations in AM and FM that cover the entire country.

Venezuela

Recently, under the initiative of the Venezuelan government of president Hugo Chávez, and with the sponsorship of the governments of Argentina, Bolivia, Cuba, Ecuador and Nicaragua, the news and documentary network teleSUR was created with the intention to be an instrument toward the "concretizing of the Bolivarian idea" through the integration of America, and as a counterweight to what the governments that fund it consider a "distorted view of Latin American reality by privately run networks that broadcast to the region". There is an ongoing debate on whether teleSUR will be able to become a neutral and fair news channel able to counter the huge influence of global media outlets, or whether it will end up as a propaganda tool of the Venezuelan government, which owns a 51 percent share of said channel.

Asia

Bangladesh
The Bengali primary state television broadcaster is Bangladesh Television which also broadcasts worldwide through its satellite based branch, BTV World. There are also terrestrial state run TV channels: Sangsad TV owned and operated by Bengali parliament that covers the proceedings of the Parliament.
The Bangladesh Betar (BB) is the country's sole state radio broadcaster. Radio transmission in the region now forming Bangladesh started in Dhaka on December 16, 1939. The Ministry of Information and Broadcasting (Bangladesh) is responsible for the administration of all government TV channels and Radio.

Brunei Darussalam
Radio Television Brunei (RTB) is the only public broadcaster in Brunei Darussalam.

Hong Kong

In Hong Kong, the Radio Television Hong Kong (RTHK) is the sole public service broadcaster. Although being a government department under the administrative hierarchy, it enjoys editorial independence. It operates seven radio channels, and produces television programmes and broadcast on commercial television channels, as these channels are required by law to provide timeslots for RTHK television programmes. RTHK would be assigned a digital terrestrial television channel during 2013 to 2015.

India
In India, Prasar Bharati is India's public broadcaster. It is an autonomous corporation of the Ministry of Information and Broadcasting (India), Government of India and comprises the Doordarshan television network and All India Radio. Prasar Bharati was established on 23 November 1997, following a demand that the government owned broadcasters in India should be given autonomy like those in many other countries. The Parliament of India passed an Act to grant this autonomy in 1990, but it was not enacted until 15 September 1997. Though a public broadcaster, it airs commercial advertisements.

Indonesia

In Indonesia, there are three types of public broadcaster. The first two are national-scale broadcasters: Radio Republik Indonesia (RRI) and Televisi Republik Indonesia (TVRI). RRI currently operates four radio networks carried by some or all of more than 90 local stations, one of them is a national programming network. TVRI operates three national television channels, plus more than 32 regional stations.

There are also independent local public broadcasters which founded by local government in several cities or regencies. They are obligated to network with either RRI or TVRI, depending on the medium, though they are not owned and operated by the two.

Iran
Islamic Republic of Iran Broadcasting is the only licensed corporation.

Japan
In Japan, the main public broadcaster is the NHK (Japan Broadcasting Corporation). The broadcaster was set up in 1926 and was modelled on the British Broadcasting Company, the precursor to the British Broadcasting Corporation created in 1927. Much like the BBC, NHK is funded by a "receiving fee" from every Japanese household, with no commercial advertising and the maintenance of a position of strict political impartiality. However, rampant non-payment by a large amount of households has led the receiving fee to become something of a political issue. NHK runs two national terrestrial TV stations (NHK General and NHK Educational) and two satellite only services (NHK BS1 and NHK BS Premium services). NHK also runs 3 national radio services and a number of international radio and television services, akin to the BBC World Service. NHK has also been an innovator in television, developing the world's first high-definition television technology in 1964 and launching high definition services in Japan in 1981.

Macau
In Macau, Teledifusão de Macau TDM is the public service broadcasting company. The firm was established in January 1982 and was modelled on Rádio e Televisão de Portugal RTP. TDM has two independent editorial arms: the Chinese news channel and the Portuguese news channel, each of which may have different information sources, points of view, and priorities of news. TDM runs both television and radio services.

Malaysia
The public broadcaster in Malaysia is the state-owned Radio Televisyen Malaysia (RTM) and TV Alhijrah. RTM was previously funded publicly through money obtained from television licensing, however it is currently state-subsidised, as television licences have been abolished.

 RTM operates 6 national, 16 state and 11 district radio stations as well as 6 national terrestrial television channels: TV1, TV2, TV Okey, SuKan RTM, Berita RTM and TV6.

Nepal
History of public broadcasting in Nepal started from 1951.

Pakistan
In Pakistan, the public broadcasters are the state-owned Pakistan Broadcasting Corporation (PBC), also known as Radio Pakistan and Pakistan Television. In the past Radio Pakistan was partly funded  through money obtained from License fees. In 1999, the Nawaz Sharif government abolished license fees for Radio Pakistan and also abolished its tax exempt status protected under PBC Act 1973. The license fees for Pakistan Television continued. The license fees collection for PTV was given to WAPDA during Musharraf government. Currently WAPDA collects Rs. 35 per house hold on electricity bills as PTV license fees. Television Broadcasting started in Pakistan with a small pilot TV Station established at Lahore Radio from where transmission was first beamed in black-and-white with effect from 26 November 1964. Television centres were established in Dhaka, Karachi and Rawalpindi/Islamabad in 1967 and in Peshawar and Quetta in 1974. PTV has various channels transmitting throughout the world including PTV National, PTV World, PTV 2, PTV Global, PTV Bolan etc. Radio Pakistan has stations covering all the major cities, it covers 80% of the country serving 95.5 Million listeners. It has world service in eleven languages daily.

Philippines

The Philippines' primary state television broadcaster is People's Television Network (PTV). Created in 1974 as Government Television (GTV), PTV is no longer state subsidised except for a one-time equity funding for capital outlay in 1992. Aside from PTV, the other public broadcaster is the Intercontinental Broadcasting Corporation (IBC), which the government has already put up for sale. The government no longer holds a controlling interest in the former state broadcaster, Radio Philippines Network (RPN).

The Philippine Broadcasting Service (PBS) is the country's sole state radio broadcaster. Established in 1933 as KZFM by the US colonial Insular Government, the radio station was passed to the Philippine government after the country became independent in 1946. Currently, PBS broadcasts its flagship network Radyo Pilipinas (formerly Radyo ng Bayan) through its 32 stations and selected affiliates nationwide.

The government is currently planning to propose the creation of a law that will merge and integrate PTV and PBS into a single entity, to be called the People's Broadcasting Corporation (PBC).

Singapore
Mediacorp is the only public broadcaster in Singapore.

South Korea
South Korea's representative public broadcasting television network is meant to be Korean Broadcasting System, or KBS. Originally a government-controlled channel, it is now an independent broadcasting system. KBS began broadcasting radio in 1947 and opened up to television industry in 1961, and officially founded its own identity by 1973. Another public broadcasting channel is the Munhwa Broadcasting Corporation, or MBC. Known to be the second channel of the country, it also shares the roles of being national television with the KBS.

South Korea also has another public broadcasting channel called Educational Broadcasting System, or EBS. Originally considered to be an extension channel of the KBS, it was spun-off as an educational channel but retained its public broadcasting tasks. KBS and EBS mainly are funded by the commercials that they provide in their channels, but due to growing competitions, this is becoming an issue for them as well.

Taiwan
Public Television Service, also called Taiwan Public Television Service Foundation, is the first independent public broadcasting institution in Taiwan, which broadcasts the Public Television Service Taiwan. Since its creation in 1998, PTS has produced several critically acclaimed dramatic programmes and mini-series despite experiencing funding difficulties. PTS is bound up in speaking for the minorities, including the promotion of Hakka Chinese and Formosan-language programming, an effort that has contributed much to the "Taiwanization" movement.

Middle East

Afghanistan
Radio Television Afghanistan (RTA) is the public broadcaster of Afghanistan and dates back to 1925.

Israel
In Israel, the Israeli Broadcasting Authority was the country's main public broadcasting service until 2017, when it was replaced by Kan (Hebrew for "here"), the Israeli Public Broadcasting Corporation.

In Arabic, the IPBC is known by the name Makan (Arabic for "place").

Kan has inherited the two main public TV channels in Israel:
 Channel 1, as of 2017 "Kan 11" - Main TV channel
 Channel 33 (Israel), as of 2017 "Makan 33" - Arabic language TV channel
Kan also includes the following 8 public radio stations, taken from IBA:
 Reshet Alef (Network A), as of 2017 "Kan Tarbut" - Podcasts and talk programs related to culture
 Reshet Bet (Network B), as of 2017 "Kan Bet" - News and current affairs
 Reshet Gimel (Network C), as of 2017 "Kan Gimel" - Israeli music
 Reshet Dalet (Network D), as of 2017 "MAKan Radio" - Arabic language station
 Reshet Hey (Network E), as of 2017 "Kan Farsi" - Persian language station, internet only
 88FM, as of 2017 "Kan 88" - Alternative music
 Kol Hamusika ("The Sound of Music"), as of 2017 "Kan Kol Hamusika" - Classical music, jazz
 REKA - Reshet Klitat Aliyah (Aliyah integration network), as of 2017 "Kan Reka" - Multilingual, mostly Russian language station
 Reshet Moreshet, as of 2017 "Kan Moreshet" - Jewish-related news and programming

The Israeli Defense Forces owns its own broadcasting network known as IDF Waves which includes 2 radio stations: 
 IDF Waves (Galey Tzahal) - broadcasting news and current affairs
 Galgalatz - broadcasting music and traffic reports
In addition, the ministry of education owns the Israeli Educational Television, known as Hinuchit, the first Israeli television channel. It was created by the Rothschild fund to aid the ministry's work in teaching children from kindergarten to high school and to promote the television's use in Israel at a time the government considered the device a "cultural decadence". It is funded and operated by the ministry, and since the 1980s it has widened its orientation to adults as well as children. In August 2018, the Educational Television was shut down and replaced by Kan Hinuchit.

Qatar
Qatar's public service broadcasting includes Qatar Media Corporation (which succeeded Qatar General Broadcasting and Television Corporation in 2009 and also inherited its assets) which predominantly focuses on local affairs, and Al Jazeera, an international public broadcasting private foundation which appeals to a pan-Arab audience in its Standard Arabic broadcasting and to miscellaneous scope of audiences in some other languages, including the pan-global English channel.

Europe

In most countries in Europe, public broadcasters are funded through a mix of advertising and public finance, either through a license fee or directly from the government.

Albania
Radio Televizioni Shqiptar (RTSH) is the public broadcaster in Albania.

Analogue TV
 Televizioni Shqiptar (TVSH) is the name of the first public channel of Albania. The domestic TV programme is distributed analogically throughout the country and digitally in Tirana through RTSH HD.
 TVSH 2 is the second public TV channel dedicated mainly to sports and live events launched in 2003.

Digital TV
 RTSH HD a digital channel launched in 2012 broadcasts TVSH shows in high-definition quality.
 RTSH Sport
 RTSH Muzikë
 RTSH Art 
 TVSH Sat, is the international version of the domestic programme broadcast to Eurovision free to air via satellite.

Radio
Radio Tirana (also, Radio Tirana 1) is the name of Albania's first radio programme, concentrating on news, talk, and features
Radio Tirana 2 is the name of the second radio program, broadcasting chiefly music and targeted at youth
Radio Tirana 3 (Programi i Tretë, Radio Tirana International) is the name of the third programme, broadcasting the international service on short wave radio in Albanian, English, French. Greek, German, Italian, Serbian, and Turkish

Regional
Radio Televizioni Gjirokastra is the local version of RTSH in Gjirokastër
Radio Televizioni Korça is the local version of RTSH in Korçë
Radio Kukësi is the local version of RT in Kukës
Radio Shkodra is the local version of RT in Shkodër

Austria

ORF (Österreichischer Rundfunk) is the public broadcaster in Austria. Despite the fact that private broadcasting companies were allowed in Austria in the late 1990s, ORF is still the key player in the field. It has three nationwide radio channels (Ö1, Ö3, FM4), nine regional ones (one for each Bundesland). Its TV portfolio includes two general interest channels (ORF 1 and ORF 2), one cultural-instructional channel (ORF III), one Eurovision-wide version of ORF 2 and a sports channel (ORF Sport +). ORF also takes part in the German-language satellite TV network 3sat.

Belgium
Belgium has three networks, one for each linguistic community:
 VRT, Dutch
 RTBF, French
 BRF, German

Originally named INR—Institut national belge de radiodiffusion—the state-owned broadcasting organization was established by law on 18 June 1930. Television broadcasting from Brussels began in 1953, with two hours of programming each day. In 1960 the INR was subsumed into RTB and BRT.

On 1 October 1945 INR-NIR began to broadcast some programmes in German. In 1961 RTB-BRT began a German-language radio channel, broadcasting from Liège.

In 1977, following Belgian federalization and the establishment of separate language communities, the French-language section of RTB-BRT became RTBF, German-language section became BRF and Dutch-language stays BRT.

BRT was renamed in 1991 to BRTN and again in 1998 to VRT.

Bulgaria
There are two public media in Bulgaria - the Bulgarian National Television (BNT) and the Bulgarian National Radio (BNR). Bulgarian National Television was founded in 1959 and the Bulgarian National Radio was founded in 1935. BNT broadcasts 4 national programs (BNT 1, BNT 2, BNT HD, BNT World). The BNR broadcasts 2 national programs (Horizont and Hristo Botev Program), 9 regional programs and Internet Radio Binar.

Croatia
Croatian Radiotelevision (HRT) is a Croatian public broadcasting company. It operates several radio and television channels, over a domestic transmitter network as well as satellite. , 70% of HRT's funding comes from broadcast user fees with each house in Croatia required to pay 79 HRK, kuna, per month for a single television (radio device, computer or smartphone), with the remainder being made up from advertising.

Czech Republic
Czech Television and Czech Radio are public broadcasters formed in 1992 to take over the Czech operations of the state-ran Czechoslovak Television and Czechoslovak Radio, respectively. Until the dissolution of Czechoslovakia in 1993, both broadcasters coexisted with their federal Czechoslovak counterparts, after which they also took over the channels previously occupied by the common federal broadcasting.

Czech Television broadcasts from three studios in Prague, Brno and Ostrava and operates several TV channels: ČT1, ČT2, ČT3, ČT24, ČT sport, ČT :D and ČT art. Czech television is funded through a monthly fee of 135 CZK which every household that owns a TV or a radio has to pay. Since October 2011 advertising on Czech TV is restricted to ČT 2 and ČT sport.

Czech Radio broadcasts four nationwide stations Radiožurnál, Dvojka, Vltava and Plus, several regional and topical digital stations. It also provides an international service Radio Prague International, which broadcasts abroad in six languages. Czech Radio is funded through a monthly fee of 45 CZK.

Denmark
DR is the national public service broadcaster. The organisation was founded in 1925, on principles similar to those of the BBC in the United Kingdom. DR runs six nationwide television channels and eight radio channels. Financing comes primarily from a yearly licence fee, that everyone who owns either a television set, a computer or other devices that can access the internet, has to pay. A part of collected fees is also used to finance the network of regional public service stations operating under the brand of TV 2. TV 2 itself, however, is a commercial government-owned television funded by subscriptions and advertising, with particular public service duties such as allowing regional stations to air their newscasts within specific timeslots of the main TV 2 channel.

Faroe Islands
Kringvarp Føroya is the organisation in Faroe Islands with public service obligations. Formed in 1957 as a radio broadcaster Útvarp Føroya. Merged with Sjónvarp Føroya TV station on 1 January 2007 to form Kringvarp Føroya. Funded by licence fees.

Estonia
Estonian Public Broadcasting (ERR) organises the public radio and television stations of Estonia. Eesti Televisioon (ETV), the public television station, made its first broadcast in 1955, and together with its sister channel ETV2 has about 20% audience share.

Finland
Yle - The Finnish Broadcasting Company, (pronounced /yle/) or Yleisradio (in Finnish) and Rundradion (in Swedish) is Finland's national public service media company. Founded in 1926, it is a public limited company majority owned by the Finnish state, employing around 2,800 people. Yle is funded by a special Yle tax. Yle has four television channels, three television channel slots, six nationwide radio channels and three radio services.

Yle TV1 is the most viewed TV channel in Finland and Yle Radio Suomi the most popular radio channel. Yle was the first of the Nordic public broadcasters to implement the Eurovision's portability regulation on its online media service Yle Areena. Yle Areena is the most used streaming service in Finland, beating even Netflix that is the most popular streaming service everywhere else.

Yle focuses highly on developing its digital services. In 2016 a Reuters Institute study of European public service companies show that Yle and BBC are the public service pioneers in digital development and performing the best while introducing innovative digital services in their news operations, developing mobile services and promoting the development of new digital approaches. Yle's Voitto robot based on machine learning is the first personal news assistant in the world to give recommendations directly on the lock screen in the Yle NewsWatch application.

France
In 1949 Radiodiffusion-télévision française (RTF – French television and radio broadcasting) was created to take over from the earlier Radiodiffusion française responsibility for the operation of the country's three public radio networks and the introduction of a public television service. A fourth radio network was added in 1954 and a second television channel in 1963.

RTF was transformed into the Office de radiodiffusion télévision française (ORTF), a more independent structure, in 1964. ORTF oversaw the introduction of a third television channel in 1972, two years before the dissolution of the structure in 1974. Between this date and 2000, each channel had its own direction structure. The first channel (TF1) was sold to the private sector in 1987. (At the time, the channel with the largest audience was the other public channel Antenne 2).

In 1986 a French/German public channel was created, ARTE, originally broadcast on cable and satellite. Later, the fall of the private channel La Cinq freed some frequencies that it had used each day after 19.00. In 1994 a new public channel, La cinquième was created to use the remaining time on the same frequencies. La cinquième and ARTE subsequently shared the same channels with the exception of satellite, cable, and internet channels where both could be broadcast all day long. In 2000 all the public channels were united into one structure, France Télévisions.

Germany

After World War II, when regional broadcasters had been merged into one national network by the Nazis to create a powerful means of propaganda, the Allies insisted on a de-centralised, independent structure for German public broadcasting and created regional public broadcasting agencies that, by and large, still exist today.

 NDR (Lower Saxony, Hamburg, Schleswig-Holstein and Mecklenburg-Vorpommern), split from former NWDR
 RBB (Berlin and Brandenburg), merged from SFB and ORB
 SWR (Baden-Württemberg and  Rhineland-Palatinate), merged from SDR and SWF
 MDR (Saxony, Saxony-Anhalt and Thuringia), established in 1991
 WDR (North Rhine-Westphalia), split from former NWDR
 BR (Bavaria)
 hr (Hesse)
 SR (Saarland)
 RB (Bremen)

In addition to these nine regional radio and TV broadcasters, which cooperate within ARD, a second national television service—actually called Second German Television (ZDF)—was later created in 1961 and a national radio service with two networks (Deutschlandradio) emerged from the remains of Cold War propaganda stations in 1994. All services are mainly financed through licence fees paid by every household and are governed by councils of representatives of the "societally relevant groups". Public TV and radio stations spend about 60% of the ≈10bn € spent altogether for broadcasting in Germany per year, making it the most well funded public broadcasting system in the world.

The Hans-Bredow-Institut, or Hans-Bredow-Institute for Media Research at the University of Hamburg (HBI) is an independent non-profit foundation with the mission on media research on public communication, particularly for radio and television broadcasting (including public service media providers) and other electronic media, in an interdisciplinary fashion.

In Germany foreign public broadcasters also exist. These are AFN for US-military staff in Germany, BFBS for British military staff, Voice of Russia, RFE and Radio Liberty.

Eventually, Arte is a French/German cultural TV channel operated jointly by France Télévisions, ZDF and ARD. It is a binational channel broadcast in both countries.

Greece

Hellenic Broadcasting Corporation (Greek: Ελληνική Ραδιοφωνία Τηλεόραση ή ERT) is the state-owned public broadcaster in Greece. It broadcasts five television channels: ERT1, ERT2, ERT3 (located in Thessaloniki city),  ERT SPORTS HD are the terrestrial broadcast channels, as well as ERT WORLD, a satellite channel focused to the Greek diaspora. ERT is broadcasting also five national (ERA 1, ERA 2, ERA 3, Kosmos, ERA Sport), and 21 local radio stations (two of them located in Thessaloniki, the second major city of Greece). All national television and radio stations are broadcast through ERT digital multiplexes across the country and through satellite, via the two digital platforms (NOVA and Cosmote).

Also, operates a web TV service with a live transmition of all the terrestrial and satellite channels as well as 4 independent OTT channels (ERT PLAY 1, 2, 3 and 4) that carries mostly sport events and older archived shows.

ERT operates 8 television studios in three buildings in Athens: five of them in the headquarters called "Radiomegaro" ("Ραδιομέγαρο" that means "radio palace") located in Agia Paraskevi area,  two of them in Katehaki str. facility and one small one in the center of Athens near the Parliament, in the Mourouzi str. facility. In Thessaloniki, ERT operates two television studios in the L. Stratou avenue and another three studios in smaller cities (Heraclion, Patras and Corfu) that can be used only for television correspondences.

ERT operates several radio studios in "Radiomegaro", in Thessaloniki (located at Aggelaki str., besides International Exhibition facility) and in 19 Greek cities, as well as a national news web site.

Hungary

Magyar Televízió (MTV) and Magyar Rádió (MR, also known internationally as Radio Budapest)   is a nationwide public  broadcasting organization in Hungary. Headquartered in Budapest, it is the oldest broadcaster in Hungary and airs four TV channels (M1 HD, M2 HD, M4 Sport and M5), and six Radio networks (Kossuth Rádió, Petőfi Rádió, Bartók Rádió, Dankó Rádió, Nemzetiségi Adások and 
Parlamenti adások) as well.

In May 2019, M3 ceases broadcasting as it was replaced by an online TV channel, m3.hu (Link: MTVA Archívum), much like BBC Three in the UK which ceased broadcasting five years earlier than M3, but pretty much the same way.

Both MTV And MR is managed and primarily funded by the Media Service Support and Asset Management Fund (abbreviated MTVA). This government organization, formed in 2011, also manages the public service broadcasters  Duna Televízió as well as the Hungarian news agency Magyar Távirati Iroda.

On 1 July 2015, Magyar Rádió and Magyar Televízió were among several public media organizations managed by the MTVA that were merged into a single organization called Duna Media Service. This organization is the legal successor to Magyar Rádió and Magyar Televízió and is an active member of the European Broadcasting Union.

Like some countries, Hungary has another public broadcaster called Duna (which was named after a river), which airs two TV channels (Duna TV (as of 2015, It broadcasts former M1 programmes as M1 became the 24-hour News Channel), Duna World (which acts as its sister broadcaster's international channel)), and only one radio network called Duna Világrádió.

Iceland
Ríkisútvarpið (RÚV) ("The Icelandic National Broadcasting Service") is Iceland's national public-service broadcasting organisation. RÚV began radio broadcasting in 1930 and its first television transmissions were made in 1966. In both cases coverage quickly reached nearly every household in Iceland. RÚV is funded by a television licence fee collected from every income taxpayer, as well as advertising revenue. RÚV has been a full active member of the European Broadcasting Union since 1956.

RÚV—which by the terms of its charter is obliged to "promote the Icelandic language, Icelandic history, and Iceland's cultural heritage" and "honour basic democratic rules, human rights, and the freedom of speech and opinion"—carries a substantial amount of arts, media, and current affairs programming, in addition to which it also supplies general entertainment in the form of feature films and such internationally popular television drama series as Lost and Desperate Housewives. RÚV's lineup also includes sports coverage, documentaries, domestically produced entertainment shows, and children's programming.

Ireland
In Ireland there are two state owned public service broadcasters, RTÉ and TG4.

Both Irish public service broadcasters receive part of the licence fee, with RTÉ taking the lion's share of the funding. Advertising makes up 50% of RTÉ's income and just 6% of TG4's income. 7% of the licence fee is provided to the Broadcasting Authority of Ireland since 2006. Up to 2006 the licence fee was given entirely to RTÉ.

RTÉ offers a range of free to air services on television; RTÉ 1, RTÉ 2, RTÉjr, and RTÉ News Now. On radio; RTÉ Radio 1, RTÉ 2FM, RTÉ Lyric FM, and RTÉ Raidió na Gaeltachta, as well as a number of channels on DAB.

The Sound and Vision Fund is operated by the Broadcasting Authority of Ireland, this fund receives 7% of the licence fee. The fund is used to assist broadcasters to commission public service broadcast programming. It is open to all independent producers provided they the backing of a free-to-air or community broadcaster, such as Virgin Media, Today FM, BBC Northern Ireland, RTÉ, Channel 4, UTV, etc. Pay TV broadcaster Setanta Sports have also received funding for programming through the Fund provided they make that programming available on a free-to-view basis.

TG4 is an independent Irish language public service broadcaster that is funded by government subsidy, part of the licence fee, and through advertising revenue.

Virgin Media is the only independent broadcaster that has public service commitments.

Italy

The Italian national broadcasting company is RAI – Radiotelevisione Italiana, founded as URI in 1924. RAI transmits thirteen channels: Rai 1, Rai 2, Rai 3, Rai 4, Rai 5, Rai News 24, Rai Premium, Rai Movie, Rai Sport, Rai Storia, Rai Gulp, Rai Yoyo, Rai Scuola (all available also in high definition). RAI also broadcasts via satellite and is involved in radio, publishing and cinema. RAI has the largest audience share (45%) of any Italian television network. Proceeds derive from a periodical standing charge (90 euros for each household in 2017) and from advertising. The main competitors of RAI are Mediaset, the biggest national private broadcaster, divided in twelve channels (two of which are both SD and HD), La7 and La7d, owned by Cairo Editore; other competitors are Sky Italia (with three FTA channels) and Discovery Italia (with seven FTA channels).

Lithuania
Lithuanian National Radio and Television (LRT) is the national broadcaster of Lithuania. It was founded in 1926 as radio broadcaster, and opened a television broadcasting subdivision in 1957. LRT broadcasts three radio stations (LRT Radijas, LRT Klasika and LRT Opus), and three TV channels (LRT televizija, LRT Plius and LRT Lituanica).

Malta
Public Broadcasting Services (PBS) is the national broadcaster of Malta. It operates three television services (TVM, TVM2, and Parliament TV) and three radio services (Radju Malta, Radju Malta 2, and Magic Malta).

Moldova
Teleradio-Moldova (TRM) is the public funded radio-TV broadcaster in Moldova. It owns the TV channels Moldova 1 and TVMI, and the radio channels Radio Moldova and Radio Moldova Internaţional.

Montenegro
RTCG (Radio Television of Montenegro) is the public broadcaster in Montenegro.

Netherlands

The Netherlands uses a rather unusual system of public broadcasting. Public-broadcasting associations are allocated money and time to broadcast their programmes on the publicly owned television and radio channels, collectively known under the NPO name. The time and money is allocated in proportion to their membership numbers. The system is intended to reflect the diversity of all the groups composing the nation.

Nordic countries
National public broadcasters in The Nordic countries were modeled after the BBC and established a decade later: Radioordningen (now DR) in Denmark, Kringkastingselskapet (now NRK) in Norway, and Radiotjänst (now Sveriges Radio and Sveriges Television) in Sweden (all in 1925). In 1926 Yleisradio (Swedish: Rundradion) now Yle was founded in Finland.

Poland
Public broadcasters include Telewizja Polska (TVP) television and Polskie Radio, however TVP in recent years has been considered to be state media by various press freedom organisations due its strong bias in favour of the ruling party, with Reporters Without Borders calling it a government mouthpiece. TVP operates three main channels: TVP 1, TVP 2 and TVP 3. It also broadcasts several digital channels (including TVP 1, TVP1 HD, TVP 2, TVP2 HD, TVP Info, TVP Kultura, TVP Historia, TVP HD, TVP Polonia, TVP Sport, TVP Seriale) via satellite and digital terrestrial television system, and 16 regional affiliates (known as TVP Regionalna, regional channels cooperate when creating most of materials). TVP also runs services with news, a video streaming (video on demand) service as well as live streaming of all its channels. Polskie Radio operates four nationwide radio channels (which are also available via the broadcaster's website). There are also 17 state-owned radio stations broadcasting in particular regions. TVP and Polish Radio are funded from several sources: state funding, advertising, obligatory tax on all TV and radio receivers, and money from authors/copyright associations. The public broadcasters offer a mix of commercial shows and programmes they are, by law, required to broadcast (i.e., non-commercial, niche programmes; programmes for children; programmes promoting different points of view and diversity; programmes for different religious and national groups; live coverage of the parliament's session on its dedicated channel: TVP Parlament; etc.). It has to be politically neutral, although in the past there have been cases of political pressure on TVP and Polskie Radio from the governing party. Recently, a new law has been passed by the ruling Law & Justice party, that in public perception allowed the party to take a much larger control over the media that has been possible before. The party states this law to be the first step to a complete public media overdo. Many worry no such improvements are actually coming and that these recent laws are only another step in taking control over the whole country by the Law & Justice party.

There is an ongoing debate in Poland about the semi-commercial nature of TVP and PR. Many people fear that making them into totally non-commercial broadcasters would result in the licence fee payable by households being increased, and fewer people being interested in programmes they offer; others say that TVP in particular is too profit-driven and should concentrate on programming that benefits the society.

Portugal

In Portugal, the national public broadcaster is Rádio e Televisão de Portugal (RTP), which in 1957 began regular broadcasts of its first channel, now RTP1. In 1968 its second channel appeared, then called "segundo programa", now RTP2. In the 1970s, TV arrived in the Portuguese islands of Madeira and the Azores, with the creation of two regional channels: RTP Madeira in 1972 and RTP Açores in 1976.

Until the 1990s the state had a monopoly on TV broadcasting, so RTP1 and RTP2 were the only Portuguese channels, both with similar generalist programmes. In 1990, RTP1 was renamed "Canal 1", and in 1992 RTP2 was renamed "TV2". With the creation of the two private channels, SIC in 1992 and Televisão Independente in 1993, the philosophy of the public service changed: in 1995, TV2 was again renamed RTP2 and became an alternative channel dedicated to culture, science, arts, documentaries, sports (except football), minorities and children. Since then, RTP2 has carried no advertising. Canal 1, renamed back RTP1 also in 1995, remained the commercial channel of RTP group, focused on entertainment, information and major sport competitions. In 2004, after a great restructuring period, RTP started its current branding. That year the two thematic channels of the group were also created—RTPN, a 24 hour-news channel which became RTP Informação in 2011 and RTP3 in 2015; and RTP Memória, dedicated to classic RTP programming. In 2014 the headquarters of RTP2 were transferred from Lisbon to Porto.

The group also has two international channels: RTP Internacional, founded in 1992 and dedicated to Eurovision, Asia and Americas, and RTP África, founded in 1998 focused on Africa, mainly the CPLP countries of Angola, Cape Verde, Guinea-Bissau, Mozambique and São Tomé and Príncipe.

The RTP group is financed by the advertising revenues from RTP1, RTP3, RTP Memória, RTP África, and RTP Internacional, and also by the taxa de contribuição audiovisual (broadcasting contribution tax), which is incorporated in electricity bills. Funding from the government budget ceased in 2014, during the Portuguese financial crisis.

Romania
Romanian Television (TVR) is the national public TV broadcaster in Romania. It operates five channels: TVR1, TVR2, TVR3, TVRi, and TVR HD, along with six regional studios in Bucharest, Cluj-Napoca, Iași, Timișoara, Craiova, and Târgu Mureș.

The public radio broadcaster is Romanian Radio Broadcasting Company (Radio Romania). It operates FM and AM, and internet national, regional, and local radio channels. The regional and local stations are branded as Radio România Regional. Broadcasting in 12 languages, Radio Romania International is the company's international radio station.

TVR and Radio Romania are funded through a hybrid financing system, drawing from the state budget, a special tax (incorporated in electricity bills), and advertising too.

Serbia
Radio Television of Serbia (RTS) is the national public broadcaster in Serbia. It operates a total of five television channels (RTS1, RTS2, RTS Digital, RTS HD and RTS SAT) and five radio stations (Radio Belgrade 1, Radio Belgrade 2, Radio Belgrade 3, Radio Belgrade 202, and Stereorama). RTS is primarily funded through public television licence fees bundled with electricity bills paid monthly, as well as advertising.

Slovakia

Radio and Television Slovakia (RTVS) is the national public broadcaster in Slovakia, with headquarters in Bratislava. This organisation was created in 2011 by merger of Slovak Television and Slovak Radio. RTVS broadcasts two television channels (STV1, STV2), five FM radio stations (Rádio Slovensko, Rádio Devín, Rádio Regina, Rádio_FM and Rádio Patria), one satellite radio channel (Radio Slovakia International) and three digital only radio stations (Rádio Klasika, Rádio Litera and Rádio Junior). RTVS is funded through monthly fee of €4.64, which every household with electricity connection must pay. The director of RTVS is Václav Mika. RTVS is a full member of European broadcasting union.

Spain
In Spain, being a highly decentralized country, two public broadcasting systems coexist: a national state-owned broadcasting corporation, Radiotelevisión Española (RTVE), that can be tuned all around Spain, and many autonomic broadcasting corporations, owned by their respective autonomous community, which only broadcast within its own territory.

RTVE provides multi-station radio and television services with its divisions Radio Nacional de España (RNE) and Televisión Española (TVE), as well as online and streaming services. RNE was founded in 1937 and broadcasts five radio stations: Radio Nacional since 1937, Radio Clásica since 1965, Radio 3 since 1979, Ràdio 4 since 1976, Radio 5 since 1989 and its international worldwide service Radio Exterior since 1942. TVE was founded in 1956 and broadcasts different television channels: La 1 (La Primera or La uno) since 1956, that is a generalist channel; La 2 (La dos) since 1966, that offers cultural programming; Teledeporte sports channel since 1994; 24 Horas news channel since 1997; Clan children's channel since 2005; and its international worldwide service TVE Internacional since 1989. RTVE Play is its over-the-top media service, and replaced in 2021 its previous online video on demand service created in 2008. Although almost all the programming is the same for all of Spain, RTVE has territorial centers in every autonomous community and produces and broadcasts some local programming in regional variations in each of them. For most of its history, RNE and TVE were funded both from public sources and private advertising; however, from September 2009, RTVE have been funded by a mixture of public tax revenue and funds collected from Spain's private television stations, thus removing advertising from its channels. A TV licence fee has been suggested, but with little popular success.

Moreover, most autonomous communities have their own public broadcaster, almost all of these are members of FORTA, and they usually tend to reproduce the model set up by RTVE. In the Autonomous Communities that have their own official language besides (Castilian) Spanish, those channels may broadcast in that co-official language. For example, this occurs in Catalonia, where CCMA's Catalunya Ràdio stations and Televisió de Catalunya channels broadcast in Catalan. In the Valencian Community, CVMC has a radio station and a television channel, both branded as À Punt and broadcast mainly in Valencian. In the Basque Country, EITB's Eusko Irratia stations and Euskal Telebista (ETB) channels broadcast in either Basque or Spanish. In Galicia, CRTVG's Radio Galega stations  and Televisión de Galicia (TVG) channels broadcast in Galician. All the autonomous community networks are funded by a mixture of public subsidies and private advertising.

Sweden

Sweden has three public service broadcasters, namely Sveriges Television (SVT), Sveriges Utbildningsradio (UR), and Sveriges Radio (SR), having previously had government monopoly. SVT is the national public television broadcaster with 4 channels (SVT 1, SVT 2, SVT BarnKanalen, and SVT 24). The aim is to make programmes for everybody. For example, Sweden has the historic Sami minority and SVT make programmes in their language for them to watch. There are also a Finnish minority in Sweden, thus SVT show news in Finnish on SVT Uutiset. SR is the radio equivalent of SVT, with channels P1, P2, P3, P4, P5, and the Finnish channel SR Sisuradio.

Ukraine

Public Broadcasting Company of Ukraine (Suspilne) is the national public broadcaster in Ukraine. It operates two national TV channels: Pershyi and Suspilne Kultura, along with 24 regional channels. Suspilne broadcasts on 3 national and 1 international radio channels: Ukrainian Radio, Radio Promin, Radio Kultura and Radio Ukraine International. The regional branches have their broadcasting slots in the broadcast schedule of the Ukrainian Radio.

United Kingdom

The United Kingdom has a strong tradition of public service broadcasting. In addition to the BBC, established in 1922, there is also Channel 4, a publicly owned, commercially funded public service broadcaster, and S4C, a Welsh-language broadcaster in Wales. Furthermore, the two commercial broadcasters ITV and Channel 5 also have significant public service obligations imposed as part of their licence to broadcast.

In the UK there are also small community broadcasters. There are now 228 stations with FM broadcast licences (licensed by Ofcom). Community radio stations typically cover a small geographical area with a coverage radius of up to 5 km and run on a nonprofit basis. They can cater for whole communities or for different areas of interest—such as a particular ethnic group, age group or interest group. Community radio stations reflect a diverse mix of cultures and interests. There are stations catering to urban or experimental music, while others are aimed at younger people, religious communities or the armed forces and their families.

Oceania

Australia
In Australia, the Australian Broadcasting Corporation (ABC) is owned by the Australian Government and is 100% taxpayer funded. The multicultural Special Broadcasting Service (SBS), another public broadcaster, now accepts limited sponsorship and advertising.

In addition, there is a large Australian community radio sector, funded in part by federal grants via the Community Broadcasting Foundation, but largely sustained via subscriptions, donations and business sponsorship. As of February 2020, there are 450+ fully licensed community radio stations  and a number of community television stations (most operating as Channel 31 despite being unrelated across different states). They are organised similarly to PBS and NPR stations in the United States, and take on the role that public access television stations have in the US.

New Zealand

In New Zealand all broadcasters are given a small slice of public broadcasting responsibility, because of the state-funded agency NZ On Air. This is because of NZ On Air's requirement for public-service programmes across all channels and stations, instead of being put into one single network. The former public broadcaster BCNZ (formerly NZBC – New Zealand Broadcasting Corporation) was broken up into separate state-owned corporations, Television New Zealand (TVNZ) and Radio New Zealand (RNZ). While RNZ remains commercial-free, about 90% of funding for TVNZ comes from selling advertising during programmes on their two stations. TVNZ continues to be a public broadcaster; however like CBC Television in Canada it is essentially a fully commercial network in continuous ratings battles with other stations, which continues to be a controversial issue within New Zealand. With the shutdown of TVNZ 7, the only fully non-commercial public-service network in New Zealand is Radio New Zealand.

Aside from television, New Zealand has a rich public radio culture, Radio New Zealand being the main provider, with a varied network (Radio New Zealand National) and a classical musical network (Radio New Zealand Concert). RNZ also provides the Pacific with its Radio New Zealand International. Aside from RNZ almost all of New Zealand's 16 regions has an "access radio" network. All these networks are commercial-free.

In late January 2020, the Labour-led coalition government announced that they were planning to merge TVNZ and Radio New Zealand to create a new public broadcasting service. In response, the opposition National Party announced that it would oppose any plans to merge Radio NZ and TVNZ.

List of public broadcasters

See also
Citizen media
International broadcasting
Mediatization, on the democratic role of the media
Public, educational, and government access

References

Citations

Linke, Benjamin (2016), Public Financing of Public Service Broadcasting and its Qualification as State Aid, Peter Lang,

External links
American Archive of Public Broadcasting
The 100th Anniversary of Public Broadcasting
Public Broadcasting Map (archived 22 July 2012)
Public Radio Map  (archived 15 September 2009)
A Model Public Service Broadcasting Law, by ARTICLE 19 (PDF)
AIR, the Association for Independents in Radio
Current, the newspaper about public TV and radio in the United States
Public Radio Exchange, non-profit distribution, peer review and licensing
Public Radio Fan website, Public Radio Fan is a listing of public radio programs and stations worldwide.
Radio College, Internet Resources for Radio Journalists and Producers
Transom, A Showcase and Workshop for New Public Radio (archived 2 November 2005)
Interview with public radio guru Jay Allison on the purpose of public media, on ThoughtCast.
Comparative Advantage – Some Considerations Regarding the Future of Public Media.
Access to the Airwaves: Principles on Freedom of Expression and Broadcast Regulation (PDF)
The Association of Public Television Stations
The Public Radio Program Directors Association
Ray Fitzwalter on public service broadcasting in Britain London Frontline Club, May 2008 (archived 9 August 2008)
PSB-Digital: Research project about the adaptation of Public Service Broadcasting to new technologies.
The Public Polish Radio Program Directors Association
Duane G. Straub papers at the University of Maryland libraries

 
Radio formats